Süreyya Ayhan Kop (born September 6, 1978) is a Turkish former female middle distance track runner who specialised in the 1500 metres. In November 2009, she was banned for life by the Court of Arbitration for Sport (CAS) due to her second anti-doping rule violation.

Ayhan ran for the sports clubs MTA Ankara and Fenerbahçe Istanbul. She then joined the Gaziantep Metropolitan Municipality Sports Club. She holds Turkish records in 800 m  (2:00.64) and 1500 m (3:55.33). She became the first Turkish woman ever to reach an Olympic semi-final during her participation in the 2000 Summer Olympics in Sydney, Australia. The next year, she became the first Turkish woman to reach a World Championship final. She was the best European woman athlete running 1500 m in two consecutive years 2002 and 2003.

Athletics career

Early career
Ayhan's father is a former amateur athlete, a local cross-country runner. He was a role model and supporter for Süreyya when she started athletics in the junior high school. In 1992, she started running competitively. She graduated from the Kahramanmaraş Sütçü İmam Üniversitesi in sport and physical education.

Born in Korgun, Çankırı, she established herself as Turkey's top 1500 m runner with a win at the 1999 national championships, setting a Turkish record. The following year she became the country's first female semi-finalist at the Olympic Games. She reached the final of the 2001 World Championships in Athletics (another first for Turkish female athletes), became the Universiade 1500 m champion and won a silver at the 2001 Mediterranean Games.

World-class breakthrough
In 2002, she won Turkey's first gold medal in a European Championships by out-sprinting World and Olympics champion Gabriela Szabo from Romania for the 1500 m title 2 seconds ahead with 3:58.79, leading from the gun to the finish. She improved further in 2003, taking two seconds off her personal best winning a silver medal in the 1500 m final of the 2003 World Championships.

Doping ban
Ayhan, one of Turkey's best hopes for a gold medal at the 2004 Athens Olympics, withdrew from the games due to an injured tendon during a training in Germany.

Allegations that Ayhan may have attempted to cheat on a pre-Olympic doping test surfaced in August after testers reportedly complained of being obstructed from carrying out their work. She was cleared of doping allegations by the IAAF, but she violated rules while taking her test. IAAF ruled that Ayhan had not taken performance-enhancing drugs, but said the athlete had broken testing rules, and she was banned for two years.

She returned to competition but failed another test while she was training in the United States in November 2007, this time after her sample tested positive for the steroids stanozolol and methandienone metabolites. This second offence meant she received a lifetime ban from the sport, but she contested the ruling, taking the case to the Court of Arbitration for Sport (CAS). The Turkish Court of Arbitration for Sport reduced her ban to four years. Ayhan took the banning to the CAS in Lausanne, however the international court reversed the decision in November 2009, upholding the lifetime ban.

Dedications

On May 26, 2003, The Turkish Mint issued a 925 silver commemoration coin worth of 10 US dollars in honor of her.

Personal bests

Progression

National titles
Turkish Athletics Championships
1500 m: 1999
Turkish Clubs Athletics Championships
800 m: 2000

International competitions

Circuit wins
Turkish Stars Indoor Championship 800 m: 1993 (2:18 )
Israeli Championships 1500 m: 1996, 1997 
Memorial Van Damme 1500 m: 2002  (3:57:75 ), 2003 (3:55:33 )
ISTAF 1500 m: 2002, 2003
Weltklasse Zürich 1500 m: 2003 (3:55:60 )

See also
List of sportspeople sanctioned for doping offences
Turkish women in sports

References

1978 births
Living people
Sportspeople from Çankırı
Turkish female middle-distance runners
Olympic athletes of Turkey
Athletes (track and field) at the 2000 Summer Olympics
World Athletics Championships athletes for Turkey
World Athletics Championships medalists
European Athletics Championships medalists
Doping cases in athletics
Turkish sportspeople in doping cases
Fenerbahçe athletes
European champions for Turkey
Mediterranean Games silver medalists for Turkey
Athletes (track and field) at the 2001 Mediterranean Games
Universiade medalists in athletics (track and field)
European Athlete of the Year winners
Mediterranean Games medalists in athletics
Universiade gold medalists for Turkey
Medalists at the 2001 Summer Universiade
21st-century Turkish sportswomen